Balázs Knoch (born 18 August 1979) is a Hungarian short track speed skater. He competed in three events at the 2002 Winter Olympics.

References

1979 births
Living people
Hungarian male short track speed skaters
Olympic short track speed skaters of Hungary
Short track speed skaters at the 2002 Winter Olympics
Sportspeople from Pécs